Thornley is a surname. Notable people with the surname include:

Ben Thornley (born 1975), English footballer
David Thornley (1935–1978), Irish politician
Douglas Thornley (born 1959), American architect
Georges William Thornley (1857–1935), French painter and printmaker
Ian Thornley, leader of Thornley, a Canadian rock band
Irvine Thornley (1883–1955), English footballer
Jeni Thornley (born 1948), Australian feminist documentary filmmaker 
John Thornley (footballer, born 1885), English footballer
John Thornley (footballer, born 1875), English footballer
Kerry Wendell Thornley (1938–1998), American Discordian, anarchist, objectivist, Zen Buddhist
Peter Thornley (born 1941), English professional wrestler who fought under the name Kendo Nagasaki
Victoria Thornley (born 1987), Welsh rower